The Liechtensteiner film industry produced one feature film in 2014. This article fully lists all non-pornographic films, including short films, that had a release date in that year and which were at least partly made by Liechtenstein. It does not include films first released in previous years that had release dates in 2014. Also included is an overview of the major events in Liechtensteiner film, including film festivals and awards ceremonies, as well as lists of those films that have been particularly well received, both critically and financially.

Minor Releases

See also

 2014 in film

References

External links

Liechtensteiner
Films
Liechtenstein